Muhammad Saleem Akhtar is a Pakistani politician who had been a member of the Provincial Assembly of the Punjab from August 2018 till January 2023.

Early life and education
He was born on 14 June 1953 in Multan, Pakistan.

He has degree of Bachelor of Arts and Bachelor of Laws.

Political career

He was elected to the Provincial Assembly of the Punjab as a candidate of Pakistan Tehreek-e-Insaf from Constituency PP-212 (Multan-II) in 2018 Pakistani general election.

References

Living people
Pakistan Tehreek-e-Insaf MPAs (Punjab)
1953 births
Politicians from Multan